Juma Fernandes da Silva (born ) is a Brazilian volleyball player as a setter.

Career
She competed at the 2015 FIVB U23 World Championship, 2016 Montreux Volley Masters, and 2018 FIVB Volleyball Women's Nations League.

Clubs
  Barueri (2013–2014)
  São Caetano (2014–2015)
  Pinheiros (2015–2016)
  Genter Bauru (2016–2018)
  Barueri (2018–2020)
  SESC Rio (2020–)

Awards

Individuals
 2014 U22 South American Championship – "Best Setter"
 2015 FIVB U23 World Championship – "Best Setter"
 2015 FIVB U23 World Championship – "Most Valuable Player"

References

External links
 FIVB Biography

1993 births
Living people
Brazilian women's volleyball players
Place of birth missing (living people)
Setters (volleyball)
Sportspeople from Belém